The discography of Tonic, an American rock band, consists of five studio albums, one live album, one compilation album, six singles, and six music videos.
Tonic was formed in Los Angeles, California in 1993. After signing a recording contract in 1995, the band released its first album in 1996, titled Lemon Parade. Based on the success of the single "If You Could Only See", Lemon Parade sold 1,300,000 copies. Tonic also contributed songs to original soundtracks in the late 1990s, such as the song "Flower Man" for The X-Files: The Album. Continuing to tour extensively, the band released an album of live songs entitled Live and Enhanced, which also featured extra content, such as the music video for the song "Soldier's Daughter".

Tonic self-produced their second studio album Sugar in 1999, from which the song "You Wanted More" came to be the lead single from the American Pie movie soundtrack. Their third studio album, 2002's Head on Straight, charted on the Billboard 200 for one week, yet the band was nominated for two Grammy awards related to the album. After the band ended a four-year hiatus in 2008, the greatest hits compilation A Casual Affair: The Best of Tonic was released in 2009. The greatest hits compilation served as a prelude to their fourth studio album, 2010's Tonic. The band later utilized crowdfunding from fans to create an all-acoustic version of Lemon Parade titled Lemon Parade Revisited in 2016, before releasing their first-ever non-album single with 2021's track "To Be Loved".

Albums

Studio albums

Live albums

Compilation albums

Singles

Soundtrack and other songs

Live cover songs
Tonic is known to have covered the songs "Jessie's Girl" (acoustic version), "Go Your Own Way", and "Suspicious Minds" at least once each in live settings. However, Tonic-played versions of these songs are not currently commercially available, with "Jessie's Girl" only known to exist as bootleg copies on file-sharing networks.

Music videos

Other music videos

Video game releases

Notes

A. "Open Up Your Eyes" and "If You Could Only See" peaked on the US Radio Songs chart.
B. "You Wanted More" peaked outside of the US Billboard Hot 100 chart, therefore it is listed on the Bubbling Under Hot 100 chart.

References

Rock music group discographies
Discography
Discographies of American artists